Verkhnyaya Sokovninka is a rural locality in Naumovsky Selsoviet Rural Settlement, Konyshyovsky District, Kursk Oblast, Russia. Population:

Geography 
The village is located on the Chmacha River (a left tributary of the Svapa River), 58 km from the Russia–Ukraine border, 69 km north-west of Kursk, 10.5 km north-west of the district center – the urban-type settlement Konyshyovka, 4 km from the selsoviet center – Naumovka.

 Climate
Verkhnyaya Sokovninka has a warm-summer humid continental climate (Dfb in the Köppen climate classification).

Transport 
Verkhnyaya Sokovninka is located 51 km from the federal route  Ukraine Highway, 43 km from the route  Crimea Highway, 28 km from the route  (Trosna – M3 highway), 14 km from the road of regional importance  (Fatezh – Dmitriyev), 6.5 km from the road  (Konyshyovka – Zhigayevo – 38K-038), 8.5 km from the road of intermunicipal significance  (Konyshyovka – Makaro-Petrovskoye, with the access road to the villages of Belyayevo and Chernicheno), 3 km from the road  (38N-144 – Oleshenka with the access road to Naumovka), on the road  (38N-146 – Staraya Belitsa – Bely Klyuch – Grinyovka), 2 km from the nearest railway halt 543 km (railway line Navlya – Lgov-Kiyevsky).

The rural locality is situated 75 km from Kursk Vostochny Airport, 170 km from Belgorod International Airport and 275 km from Voronezh Peter the Great Airport.

References

Notes

Sources

Rural localities in Konyshyovsky District